Philippe Delaurier (born 12 December 1960) is a French former professional racing cyclist. He rode in the 1986 Tour de France.

References

External links

1960 births
Living people
French male cyclists
People from Cambrai
Sportspeople from Nord (French department)
Cyclists from Hauts-de-France